The Yugantar is a Marathi weekly newspaper published in Maharashtra, India. It is the official organ of the Maharashtra State Council of the Communist Party of India.

References

Communist periodicals published in India
Communist Party of India
Communist newspapers
Marathi-language newspapers